"Jombolo" is a song by Nigerian singer Iyanya. It was released as the sixth single from his second studio album, Desire (2013). The song debuted at number one on 360nobs' Top 10 Most Downloaded Songs chart from 21 to 27 July 2013. It was produced by GospelOnDeBeatz and features vocals from Nigerian singer Flavour N'abania.

Music video
The music video for "Jombolo" was directed by Sesan Ogunro. It features numerous waist movement and beautiful women.

Accolades
The music video for "Jombolo" was nominated for Best High Life Video and "est Use of Choreography at the 2013 Nigeria Music Video Awards (NMVA). The video was also nominated for Most Gifted Afro Pop at the 2014 Channel O Music Video Awards.

Track listing
 Digital single

References

Iyanya songs
2013 songs
2013 singles
Flavour N'abania songs